The Society of Abidance in Truth (SAT) is a spiritual nonprofit organization (501(c)(3))  consecrated to the teachings of Advaita Vedanta, especially as revealed by Sri Ramana Maharshi.

Publications

The Society of Abidance in Truth has published English translations of works such as the Ribhu Gita, an essential and classic work of Advaita Vedanta highly recommended by Sri Ramana Maharshi. The translation has since then been re-published by Sri Ramanasramam (Tiruvannamalai, India) and translated into Hindi, Italian, Korean, and German. Below is the list of their current publications:

The Ribhu Gita, Translated by Dr. H. Ramamoorthy and Nome, First Edition 1995, : This is the English translation from the original Sanskrit epic Sivarahasyam.
The Ribhu Gita, Translated by Dr. H. Ramamoorthy and Nome, Second Edition 2017,  : This is the second edition of the English translation from the original Sanskrit epic Sivarahasyam.
The Song of Ribhu, Translated by Dr. H. Ramamoorthy and Nome, 2000, : This is the English translation of  the Tamil Ribhu Gita.
The Song of Ribhu Audiobook: Chapters 1 through 11, Reading in English by Nome accompanied by soft vina music by Zia Mohiuddin Dagar (Rudra vina, Raga Yaman), 
Nirguna Manasa Puja: Worship of the Attributeless one in the Mind, by Adi Sankara, Translated by Dr. H. Ramamoorthy and Nome, 1993, 
Svatmanirupanam, by Adi Sankara, Translated by Dr. H. Ramamoorthy and Nome, 2002, 
Nirvana-Satkam, by Adi Sankaracarya, Translated by Nome, 2004, 
A Bouquet of Nondual Texts, by Adi Sankara, Translated by Dr. H. Ramamoorthy and Nome, 2006, 
Origin of Spiritual Instruction, by Bhagavan Sri Ramana Maharshi, 2006, 
Timeless Presence, by Nome, 2003, 
Four Requisites for Realization and Self-Inquiry, by Nome, 2003, 
Saddarsanam and An Inquiry into the Revelation of Truth and Oneself, by Sri Ramana Maharshi, Translation and Commentary by Nome, 2009, 
Advaita Devatam: God of Nonduality, Edited by Nome, 2009, 
Poetry from Advaita Devatam (Audio CD), Recitation by Nome, Vocals by Sasvati, Vina by Jayalakshmi Sekhar and E. Gayatri, 
The Essence of the Spiritual Instruction, by Bhagavan Sri Ramana Maharshi, Translated with Commentary by Nome, 2011, 
The Quintessence of True Being, by Nome, 2011, 
Ever Yours In Truth, by Nome, 2015, 
One Self, by Nome, 2015, 
Parabhakti, by Nome, 2015, 
Self-Realization, by Bhagavan Sri Ramana Maharshi, First Reprint 1996, Second Reprint 2016, With the kind permission of Sri Ramanasramam, Tiruvannamalai, India, 
Hastamalakiyam: A Fruit in the Hand or A Work by Hastamalaka, by Adi Sankara and Sri Ramana Maharshi, Translated by Dr. H. Ramamoorthy and Nome, 2017, 
Essence of Inquiry: Vicharasangraham, A Commentary by Nome, by Sri Ramana Maharshi, Gambhiram Seshayya, Nome, Second Edition 2019. 
Five Flowers of Self-Knowledge: Atma-Vidya, Atma-Vidya of Bhagavan Sri Ramana Maharshi with explanation by Nome, 2019, 
The Light of Wisdom, A commentary on selected verses from Sri Ramana Maharshi’s Supplement of the Forty Verses on Reality and Five Verses on the One Self (Ekatma Panchakam) by Nome, 2020, 

The Society of Abidance in Truth also publishes a quarterly online journal called Reflections containing transcripts of Satsangs given by Nome, the teachings of Sri Ramana Maharshi, excerpts from The Ramana Way (the journal of Ramana Maharshi Centre for Learning), and excerpts from other Advaitic scriptures.

Temple
The Society of Abidance in Truth, also known as SAT Temple, is located in Santa Cruz, California. Spiritual events, such as Satsangs and retreats, are held in the temple throughout the year. Spiritual guidance is provided by Nome, who practiced self-inquiry for steady abidance in Self-Realization.

See also
 List of Hindu temples in the United States
 List of Hindu temples outside India

Notes

References
 Hinduism Today, Published by Himalayan Academy, October 1995 
 Hinduism Today, Published by Himalayan Academy, March 2003 
 Guidestar Report 
 Essence of Enquiry, by Sri Ramana Maharshi/Gambhiram Seshayya, Commentary by Nome, Published by Ramana Maharshi Centre for Learning
 Centenary Souvenir Commemorating the Advent of Bhagavan Sri Ramana at Arunachala, Sri Ramanasramam, September 1996

External links
 Society of Abidance in Truth
 Article on History of SAT

Hindu organizations based in the United States
Hindu organizations
Ashrams
Hinduism in California
Advaita Vedanta
Buildings and structures in Santa Cruz County, California
Indian-American culture in California